Jean-Samuel Blanc (born November 1, 1990) is a professional Canadian football defensive linemen for the Montreal Alouettes of the Canadian Football League (CFL). After going undrafted in the 2015 CFL Draft, Blanc signed with the Alouettes on May 19, 2015 and made the team's active roster following training camp that year. He played college football for the Montreal Carabins where he was a member of the 50th Vanier Cup championship team.

Professional career
Blanc signed a contract extension with the Montreal Alouettes on January 20, 2021.

References

External links
Montreal Alouettes bio 

1990 births
Canadian football defensive linemen
Montreal Carabins football players
Living people
Montreal Alouettes players
Canadian football people from Montreal
Players of Canadian football from Quebec